Achitchaung is a village in Ann Township, Kyaukpyu District, in central Rakhine State in the westernmost part of Burma (Myanmar). It is southwest of Ann, near Yebôk. Achitchaung is located near the Amyeak and Kyaukpadaung rivers.

Notes

External links
"Achitchaung Map — Satellite Images of Achitchaung" Maplandia

Populated places in Kyaukpyu District
Ann Township